The US Post Office—Salem Main is a historic post office building at 2 Margin Street in Salem, Massachusetts.  It is one of Salem's finest civic Colonial Revival buildings.  
 The two story brick building was built in 1932 to a design by Wenham-based architect Philip Horton Smith of Smith & Walker.  Its roof follows a cross-gable plan, with its main entry on the long side of the building, topped by a decorated pedimented gable.  First floor windows are round-arched and slightly recessed, while those on the second floor are rectangular.  A line of granite marks the transition to the cornice at the top of the facade; the cornice, along with the gable elements, features heavy dentil molding.

The building was listed on the National Register of Historic Places in 1986; it continues to serve as Salem's primary post office.

See also 

National Register of Historic Places listings in Salem, Massachusetts
National Register of Historic Places listings in Essex County, Massachusetts

List of United States post offices

References 

Government buildings completed in 1932
Salem
Buildings and structures in Salem, Massachusetts
National Register of Historic Places in Salem, Massachusetts